Garcha may refer to:
Garcha, Azerbaijan, village in Azerbaijan
Garcha, SBS Nagar, village in India

People with the name
Garcha Blair (born 1976), Bahamian cricketer
Kuldeep Singh Garcha (born 1943), Indian polo player and soldier
Harjinder Singh Garcha (born 1982), British Indian musician also known as Jindi G